The Bristol Bulldogs were a British motorcycle speedway team based in the Knowle Stadium, Bristol, England from 1928 to 1978.

History
The club was formed in 1928. Their first trophy was the Provincial League title in 1937. The track operated a season of challenge matches in 1946 with the team known as Ex-Bristol. They competed in the National League Division Two from 1947. The team was promoted to National League Division One in 1950 after back to back Championship titles. The Division One Bulldogs team featured most of the Division Two men and as a result they reverted to Division Two for the 1954 season.

Bristol's team of 1949 has a rare record in that it whitewashed the visiting Glasgow Tigers 70 -14 in a fourteen heat National League fixture.

The Bulldogs were founder members of the Provincial League, winning the Provincial League Knockout Cup, but the track closed for the site to be re-developed and the team operated out of Plymouth for 1961 as Plymouth Bulldogs.

Speedway returned to Bristol and Eastville Stadium in 1977 in what was effectively the Newport Wasps becoming the Bristol Bulldogs for one season. Crowds of 7,000+ were averaged in both years, far larger than most clubs. The track operated in 1978 but was closed due to planning matters. A year or two after closing a Bristol Select team rode at Birmingham (for legal reasons they could not use the Bulldogs name). Over 1,000 Bristol speedway fans travelled up to Birmingham, such was their love for the sport. Stars of the former team included Australian Phil Crump, father of world champion Jason Crump.

In February 2010, Bristol Speedway Ltd lodged a pre-application for planning permission to build a Speedway track on the former Shell Tankers site, Avonmouth, Bristol and on 15 October 2012, they re-submitted a pre-application for a new Speedway track and Moto Cross track at Avonmouth, Bristol. In 2017, plans were being worked on bringing the Bulldogs team back on the track in 2018 in a series of away challenge meetings.

Season summary

Notable riders

See also
List of defunct motorcycle speedway teams in the United Kingdom

References 

Defunct British speedway teams
Sport in Bristol